Sister Loretta Schafer, S.P., (April 17, 1917 – February 19, 1998) was the Superior General of the Sisters of Providence of Saint Mary-of-the-Woods, Indiana, from 1976 to 1981. In 1977, she worked with the United States Department of Housing and Urban Development to develop and construct the Maryvale Retirement Complex at Saint Mary-of-the-Woods, Indiana.

Schafer served as Chancellor of the Archdiocese of Indianapolis, the first woman to serve in this position.

In 1978, she sold Chicago's Providence St. Mel School, which had been property of the Sisters of Providence, to principal Paul Adams after the Archdiocese of Chicago withdrew financial support. The story of the community's rallying spirit to keep the school open gained national attention and press, including a Reader's Digest article "A School That Wouldn't Die".

References

 

 

 

 

Sisters of Providence of Saint Mary-of-the-Woods
1998 deaths
1917 births
20th-century American Roman Catholic nuns